Keshet (Hebrew: קשת, 'rainbow'), or Qeshet, may refer to:

People
Ben-Zion Keshet (1914–1984), Israeli politician
Eli Keshet (born 1945), Israeli biochemist 
Leah Keshet, an Israeli–Canadian mathematical biologist
Shula Keshet (born 1959), Israeli activist and publisher
Yeshurun Keshet (1893–1977), Israeli writer

Other uses
 Keshet Media Group, an Israeli mass media company
 Keshet International
 Keshet (organization), a Jewish LGBTQ nonprofit organization in the U.S.
 Keshet, Golan Heights, an Israeli moshav/settlement in the Golan Heights
 INS Keshet, the name of two ships of the Israeli Sea Corps
Keshet Cave, a natural arch, Israel

See also

Rainbow (the meaning of Keshet in Hebrew)
Genesis flood narrative

mr:तिरंदाजी